Freddy's Frozen Custard & Steakburgers is an American fast-casual restaurant chain based in Wichita, Kansas. Its menu includes steakburgers, Vienna Beef hot dogs, and chicken sandwiches, and the company provides frozen custard with a variety of specialty sundaes and concretes (blended sundaes).

History
Freddy's was founded by restaurateur Scott Redler and two brothers, Bill and Randy Simon, whose father, Freddy Simon was the inspiration for the restaurant, and its namesake. Freddy was a World War II Veteran who lived in Wichita, Kansas.

The company, founded in Wichita in 2002, opened its first franchise in Hutchinson, Kansas, in December 2004. In April 2011, the company opened its 50th store in Victorville, California, and in October 2013 its 100th store in Bowling Green, Kentucky. Its 150th location opened in April 2015 in Loveland, Colorado. Freddy's opened its 300th location in Indianapolis, Indiana, in March 2018. In August 2021, the restaurant chain opened their first Wisconsin location in Grand Chute, just outside of Appleton. As of August 2021, Freddy’s has more than 380 restaurants across 32 states.

Co-founder and one of the sons of Freddy Simon, Bill Simon, died at age 61 on December 17, 2016, from cancer.

Frederick "Freddy" L. Simon, co-founder and namesake of Freddy's Frozen Custard & Steakburgers died on October 25, 2020, at the age of 95.
 
In March 2021, private equity firm Thompson Street Capital Partner purchased Freddy's Frozen Custard & Steakburgers for an undisclosed amount.

In May 2021, Freddy's hired Chris Dull as CEO to take over the top post from co-founder Randy Simon.

In August 2022, Freddy's hired Brian Wise as COO to take over the operations post from co-founder Scott Redler.

In November of 2022, the company signed a master franchise and development agreement that will allow the brand to enter the Canadian market. The chain plans to expand across nine Canadian provinces, excluding Quebec.

See also
 List of frozen custard companies

References

External links

Restaurants in Kansas
Fast-food chains of the United States
Regional restaurant chains in the United States
Restaurants established in 2002
Frozen custard
Ice cream parlors in the United States
Hot dog restaurants in the United States
2002 establishments in Kansas
Fast casual restaurants
Companies based in Wichita, Kansas